Floc can refer to:

 Farm Labor Organizing Committee, a labor union
 Federated Learning of Cohorts (FLoC), a type of web tracking for interest-based advertising
 Federated Logic Conference (FLoC), a conglomeration of mathematical logic and computer science conferences
 Floc (or flock), flake of precipitate that comes out of solution during the process of flocculation
 Floc (biofilm), a specialized biofilm suspended in water
 Floc de Gascogne, a sweet apéritif made from a blend of grape juice and Armagnac